was a Japanese vocalist, composer and arranger. She has been compared to Enya in that she "multitracked her voice into angelic choruses, soaring over spare but emotional arrangements",
She lent her talents to more than 1,000 television commercials, and produced five solo albums, in addition to one under the name of Stella Mirus and two with her husband, Itaru Watanabe, from 2000 until her death. In 2017,  Universal Japan released her album, Skip!, recorded in 1986, a 10-track album of 'Light Mellow' music. There is also an edition called Skip! +4 which contains four bonus tracks.

Discography

Mai
Released January 9, 2001 by Pacific Moon.
Horizon
Honen Bushi (ft. Anna Sato)
Konjaku Monogatari (Stories, modern and ancient)
Aqua
A Lullaby of Takeda
First Love
Mai
Rakuen
A Song of Birth
China Rose

Kaori
Released April 12, 2005 by Pacific Moon.
Voyage to Asia
Iroha Song
Breath of Earth
Teinsagu nu Hana
Silence
Etenraku
Eternal Prayer
Ancient City
Kunino Sazuchi
Fragrance
Voyage to Asia (A Cappella Version)

Air
A collaboration with Stella Mirus. Released August 19, 2000 by Pacific Garden.
Air (For The G String) (Johann Sebastian Bach)
Gymnopédies No.1 (Erik Satie)
In Your Arms
Sonata Für Klavier Nr.14 (Ludwig van Beethoven)
Aquamarin
Stẽlla
Siciliana (Gabriel Fauré)
Tableaux d'une exposition (Modest Petrovich Mussorgsky)
Silent Love

Stẽlla Mirus II
Sunshine Filtering through Foliage
Adagio (Tomaso Albinoni)
Cuckoo
Menuett BWV Anh.114〜BWV115 (Johann Sebastian Bach)
Pray
Die Moldau (Bedřich Smetana)
A Drop of a Moonlit Night
Kanon (Johann Pachelbel)
Toy's Night
A Star Clock
Pure

Kokoro No Niwa
Genji Millennia Story
Into a Sleep
Heart of Earth
Far an Away Journey
Juvenile Mind
Miracle of Time
Beginning
Spirit of Forest
Mirage
Tapestry

Stẽlla Mirus III

Share Pain
Our Music (Eri Ver.)
With a Wish
Pray In The Night
Shooting Star
Arcadia
AOZORA
Sound Of Music (The Sound Of Music)
My Favorite Things
Space
Under a Quiet Wave

Collaborations

She also released two albums with her husband Itaru Watanabe, entitled "Erital Christmas" in 2008 and "Erital Pops" in 2016.

Death

She died on 21 December 2016 after being diagnosed with, and receiving treatment for, pancreatic cancer.

References

External links
Eri Sugai Official Website
Pacific Moon
 

1961 births
2016 deaths
Japanese composers
Japanese women composers
Japanese women singers
Japanese music arrangers
Deaths from pancreatic cancer